Zaozerye is a rural locality (a village) in Ust-Kachkinskoye Rural Settlement, Permsky District, Perm Krai, Russia. The population was 43 as of 2010. There are 6 streets.

Geography 
It is located 11 km south-west from Ust-Kachka.

References 

Rural localities in Permsky District